Bernardo Fernandes da Silva or simply Bernardo (born 20 April 1965) is a retired Brazilian football player. He is now a player agent. His son Bernardo Fernandes da Silva Junior is also a footballer.

Club statistics

National team statistics

References

External links

Bernardo at cerezo-museum.com 

1965 births
Living people
Brazilian footballers
Brazilian expatriate footballers
Brazil international footballers
Marília Atlético Clube players
São Paulo FC players
FC Bayern Munich footballers
Santos FC players
Club América footballers
Expatriate footballers in Germany
Expatriate footballers in Mexico
Expatriate footballers in Japan
CR Vasco da Gama players
Sport Club Corinthians Paulista players
Club Athletico Paranaense players
Bundesliga players
Brazilian football agents
J1 League players
Cerezo Osaka players
Association football midfielders
Footballers from São Paulo